Cryptarcha is a genus of sap beetles, insects in the family Nitidulidae.

 Names brought to synonymy
 Cryptarcha elegans, a synonym for Eucalosphaera elegans

Species
These 17 species belong to the genus Cryptarcha:
 Cryptarcha ampla Erichson, 1843 i c g b
 Cryptarcha bifasciata Baudi, 1870 g
 Cryptarcha concinna Melsheimer, 1853 i c g b
 Cryptarcha gila Parsons, 1938 i c g
 Cryptarcha glabra Schaeffer, 1909 i c g
 Cryptarcha inhalita
 Cryptarcha jenisi
 Cryptarcha kapfereri
 Cryptarcha lewisi
 Cryptarcha undata
 Cryptarcha maculata Reitter, 1873 g
 Cryptarcha nitidissima
 Cryptarcha omisitoides Reitter, 1873 g
 Cryptarcha optanda
 Cryptarcha strigata (Fabricius, 1787) g
 Cryptarcha strigatula Parsons, 1938 i c g b
 Cryptarcha undata (Olivier, 1790) g
Data sources: i = ITIS, c = Catalogue of Life, g = GBIF, b = Bugguide.net

References

 Jelínek, J.; Lasoń, A. 2007: A new species of Cryptarcha (Coleoptera: Nitidulidae) from Madagascar. Acta Entomologica Musei Nationalis Pragae 47: 127–133.

External links 

 
 
 
 Cryptarcha  at insectoid.info

Nitidulidae
Cucujoidea genera
Taxa named by William Edward Shuckard